Nordgren, Nordgreen, Nordgrén is a Swedish surname, a 'soldier name' from Uppland. It  may refer to:

People
Adam Nordgren, midfielder for Assi IF
Alexander Nordgren, member of Christoffer Sundgren's team
Andie Nordgren, coiner of relationship anarchy and producer for Eve Online
Anna Nordgren, painter
Annika Nordgren Christensen operator at TV4 Newsmill
Becky Nordgren (born 1961), American politician
Brian Nordgren, rugbyist
Erik Nordgren, musician
Gösta "Snoddas" Nordgren, entertainer
Hampus Nordgren Hemlin former member of Kate Boy
Hannes Nordgren, member of Olofströms IK
Ingemar Nordgren, historian researcher of the Ring of Pietroassa
Joseph Nordgren, physicist
Leif Nordgren, biathlete
Loran Nordgren, co-proposer of unconscious thought theory
Mats Nordgren, Swedish international footballer
Matt Nordgren, cast member in Most Eligible Dallas and quarter back in the 2005 Texas Longhorns football team
Niklas Nordgren, hockey forward born in 1979
Niklas Nordgren (born 2000), competed in Finland at the 2016 Winter Youth Olympics
Olivia Nordgren, typographer
Olov Nordgren, coach of Assi IF
Otto Nordgren, member of Olofströms IK
Pehr Henrik Nordgren, composer
Per Nordgren, member of Grotesque (band)
Peter Nordgren, gold medalist in shooting at the 2013 Island Games
Pontus Nordgren, gold medalist in shooting at the 2013 Island Games
Sharon Nordgren, politician
Sune Nordgren, former director of the National Museum of Art, Architecture and Design
Tyler Nordgren, astronomer who worked on the MarsDial design team, researched Chi Cassiopeiae

Characters
George Nordgren from Arthur

See also
Nordegren (disambiguation)

References

Swedish-language surnames